UAAP Season 79 (also known as UAAP LXXIX) is the 2016–2017 athletic year of the University Athletic Association of the Philippines (UAAP). This season, hosted by the University of Santo Tomas officially opened on September 3, 2016. The opening ceremony was held at the UST Plaza Mayor at 3:00 pm with the formal introduction of ballroom dancing as a demonstration sport in this season by the host school University of Santo Tomas (UST) at España, Manila. The official ceremony started at 5:00 pm as there was a concert party themed "Dare to Dream" where the official theme song for the season was revealed. However, unlike in the previous years when the first double-header basketball games were held following the opening ceremonies, this year it was held the following day, September 4 at the Smart Araneta Coliseum.

The eight member universities of the UAAP are competing in fifteen sports to vie for the overall championship. Season 79 marks the start of Ateneo's participation in the Juniors Girls division. Ateneo fielded teams in the Juniors Girls Swimming, Fencing and Track & Field tournaments. For more information check here;

Opening ceremony
The opening ceremony of the UAAP Season 79 was held at the University of Santo Tomas main campus in España, Sampaloc, Manila on September 3, 2016. The ceremony kicked off with a ballroom Formation competition at the Quadricentennial Pavilion.

Ballroom dancing, which all member schools (except FEU) participated, was the newest demonstration sport and a side event before the commencement of UAAP basketball competition. University of the Philippines swept both the Latin and Standard categories in the said competition.

After the event, an opening parade and program proper, followed by an outdoor concert was also held at the nearby Plaza Mayor. The performers include: the UST Salinggawi Dance, Conservatory of Music choirs: Coro Tomasino, and Liturgikon Vocal Ensemble, along with the Conservatory of Music orchestra. Soloist Neil Morales sang the theme "Dare to Dream" composed by Neo Hernandez.

The first doubleheader games of the men's basketball tournament will start the next day at the Smart Araneta Coliseum.

A press conference was conducted at the Novotel Manila in Quezon City, 4 days before the actual opening.

Rule changes
Starting this season, the UAAP officially decided to remove the thrice-to-beat advantage of teams which sweep the elimination rounds in all UAAP sports. In the new rule, a team which will get a perfect record in the elimination rounds will have an outright Finals slot and the championship will be decided via a best-of-3 series, while the other top 3 teams will play using the current stepladder format in the  semi-final round with the number 2 seed getting a twice-to-beat advantage. The team which wins the stepladder round gets to play against the sweeping team in a Best of Three Finals. However, in Football, there will be no twice-to-beat advantage for the top 2 seeded teams in the Final Four round and no best-of-three series in the Finals. All match-ups will be a one-game affair.

In addition, the traditional singing of school hymns will be played during the pre-game warm-ups, instead of after the games.

Sports calendar
This is the tentative calendar of events of the UAAP Season 79. The list includes the tournament host schools and the venues.

First semester

Second semester

Basketball

Seniors' division
The UAAP Season 79 seniors division basketball tournament began on September 4, 2016, the day after the official opening. The tournament host is the University of Santo Tomas and the tournament commissioner is Atty. Rebo Saguisag. The UAAP have adopted FIBA rules on technicals, timeouts, among others. The tournament still used referees from BRASCU for officiating.

Men's tournament

Elimination round

Team standings

Playoffs

Awards
 Most Valuable Player: 
 Rookie of the Year:

Women's tournament

Elimination round

Team standings

Playoffs

Awards
 Most Valuable Player: 
 Rookie of the Year:

Juniors' division
The UAAP Season 79 Juniors' division basketball tournament started on November 12, 2016. The tournament venue will be at the Filoil Flying V Centre. The tournament host is the Far Eastern University.

Boys' tournament

Elimination round

Team standings

Playoffs

Awards
 Most Valuable Player: 
 Rookie of the Year:

Volleyball

Seniors' division
The UAAP Season 79 seniors division volleyball tournament will start on February 4, 2017. The tournament main venue is the Filoil Flying V Centre in  San Juan City while selected games will be played at the Smart Araneta Coliseum in Cubao, Quezon City and the Mall of Asia Arena in Pasay. The tournament host is the University of Santo Tomas. Rustico "Otie" Camangian is the tournament commissioner.

Men's tournament

Elimination round

Playoffs

Awards
 Most Valuable Player: 
Rookie of the Year:

Women's tournament

Elimination round

Playoffs

Awards
 Most Valuable Player: 
 Finals MVP :  
Rookie of the Year:

Juniors' division
The UAAP Season 79 juniors' volleyball tournament started on September 10, 2016. The tournament venue will be at the Adamson University Gym. Adamson is the tournament host. The number of participating schools in the boys' and girls' tournaments increased to eight and seven, respectively. Far Eastern University fielded boys' and girls' volleyball teams beginning season 77. Adamson fielded a boys' team starting season 79. Since there are now more than six participating schools in each tournament, both tournaments will have a Final Four format. The UAAP Board decided to move the high school volleyball tournaments from 2nd semester to 1st semester in Season 78 due to the basketball juniors tournament being moved from the 1st semester to 2nd semester.

Boys' tournament

Elimination round

Playoffs

Awards
 Most Valuable Player: 
 Rookie of the Year:

Girls' tournament

Elimination round

Playoffs

Awards
 Most Valuable Player: 
 Rookie of the Year:

Beach volleyball
The UAAP Season 79 beach volleyball tournament began on October 1, 2016. The tournament venue was at the Sands at SM by the Bay, SM Mall of Asia in Pasay, Metro Manila. University of the East was the tournament host. Beach volleyball is a single round-robin elimination tournament.

Men's tournament

Elimination round

 Team standings

 Match-up results

Playoffs

Awards
 Most Valuable Player: 
 Rookie of the Year:

Women's tournament

Elimination round

 Team standings

 Match-up results

Playoffs

Awards
 Most Valuable Player: 
 Rookie of the Year:

Football

The UAAP Season 79 seniors division football tournament will start on February 4, 2017 at the Rizal Memorial Football Stadium. The tournament venue will be at the following football fields: Rizal Memorial Stadium (during weekends) and the Ateneo Moro Lorenzo Field (during weekdays). The tournament host is Ateneo and Rely San Agustin is the tournament commissioner.

Men's tournament

Elimination round

Team standings

Playoffs

Awards
 Most Valuable Player: 
 Rookie of the Year:

Women's tournament

Elimination round

Playoffs

Awards
 Most Valuable Player: 
 Rookie of the Year:

Boys' tournament
The UAAP Season 79 juniors' division football tournament started on December 3, 2016.  All games are scheduled to take place at the Ateneo Moro Lorenzo Football field on December 3, 10, 17 for the first round and January 14, 21, 28, 2017 for the second round. The championship game is scheduled for February 4, 2017. Ateneo is the tournament host.

Elimination round

Finals

Awards
Most Valuable Player: 
Rookie of the Year:

Baseball
The UAAP Season 79 Seniors' division baseball tournament began on February 4, 2017 at the Rizal Memorial Baseball Stadium in Malate Manila. The tournament host is La Salle.

Men's tournament

Elimination round

 Team standings

 Match-up results

 Scores
Results to the right and top of the gray cells are first round games, those to the left and below are second round games. Superscript is the number of innings played before the mercy rule applied.

Finals

Awards
 Season Most Valuable Player: 
 Finals Most Valuable Player: 
 Rookie of the Year: 
 Best Pitcher: 
 Best Hitter: 
 Best Slugger: 
 Most Runs Batted-In : 
 Most Home-runs :  and 
 Most Stolen Bases :

Boys' tournament
The UAAP Season 79 Juniors' division baseball (demonstration sport) tournament began on February 4, 2017 at the Rizal Memorial Baseball Stadium in Malate Manila. The tournament host is La Salle.

Elimination round

 Team standings

 Match-up results

Scores
Results to the right and top of the gray cells are first round games, those to the left and below are second round games. Superscript is the number of innings played before the mercy rule applied.

Finals

Awards
 Most Valuable Player: 
 Rookie of the Year:

Softball
The UAAP Season 79 softball tournament began on February 4, 2017 at the Rizal Memorial Baseball Stadium in Malate Manila. 
The tournament host is La Salle. Softball is a sport for women only in the UAAP.

Women's tournament

Elimination round

Team standings

Match-up results

Scores
Results to the right and top of the gray cells are first round games, those to the left and below are second round games. Superscript is the number of innings played before the mercy rule applied.

Playoffs

Awards
 Season Most Valuable Player: 
 Finals Most Valuable Player: 
 Rookie of the Year: 
 Best Pitcher: 
 Best Hitter: 
 Best Slugger: 
 Most Runs Batted-In : 
 Most Stolen Bases : 
 Most Home-runs :

Badminton
The UAAP Season 79 badminton tournament began on September 16, 2016. The tournament venue was the Rizal Memorial Badminton Hall in Vito Cruz St., Malate, Manila. Badminton is a single round-robin elimination tournament. Far Eastern University was the tournament host.

Seniors' division

Men's tournament

Elimination round

 Team standings

 Match-up results

Playoffs

Awards
 Most Valuable Player: 
 Rookie of the Year:

Women's tournament

Elimination round

 Team standings

 Match-up results

Playoffs

Awards
 Most Valuable Player: 
 Rookie of the Year:

Judo
The UAAP Season 79 Judo Championships was held from November 19–20, 2016 at the De La Salle Zobel Sports Pavilion in Ayala Alabang, Muntinlupa. The tournament host was De La Salle University.

Seniors' division

Men's tournament

Medal tally

Event host in boldface

Awards
 Most Valuable Player: 
 Rookie of the Year:

Women's tournament

Medal tally

Event host in boldface

Awards
 Most Valuable Player: 
 Rookie of the Year:

Juniors' division

Boys' tournament

Medal tally

Event host in boldface

Awards
 Most Valuable Player: 
 Rookie of the Year:

Girls' tournament
This is a demonstration event.

Medal tally

Event host in boldface

Awards
 Most Valuable Player: 
 Rookie of the Year:

Swimming
The UAAP Season 79 Swimming Championships was held from October 21–24, 2016 at the Rizal Memorial Swimming Pool in Vito Cruz St., Malate, Manila. The tournament host was University of the Philippines and tournament commissioner was Richard G. Luna. The number of participating teams in the Girls' tournament increased by one school with the participation of Ateneo.

Team ranking is determined by a point system, similar to that of the overall championship. The points given are based on the swimmer's/team's finish in the finals of an event, which include only the top eight finishers from the preliminaries. The gold medalist(s) receive 15 points, silver gets 12, bronze has 10. The following points: 8, 6, 4, 2 and 1 are given to the rest of the participating swimmers/teams according to their order of finish.

Seniors' division

Men's tournament
Team standings
 
Rec - Number of new swimming records established
Event host in boldface

Awards
 Most Valuable Player: 
 Rookie of the Year:

Women's tournament
Team standings

Rec - Number of new swimming records established
Event host in boldface

Awards
 Most Valuable Player: 
 Rookie of the Year:

Juniors' division

Boys' tournament
Team standings

Rec - Number of new swimming records established
Event host in boldface

Awards
 Most Valuable Player: 
 Rookie of the Year:

Girls' tournament
Team standings

Rec - Number of new swimming records established
Event host in boldface

Awards
 Most Valuable Player: 
 Rookie of the Year:

Performance sports

Ballroom dancing
The UAAP Season 79 opened with a new competition, Ballroom Dancing. UP swept the competition. The UP Ballroom Formation Team claimed the championship in both Latin-American and Standard Ballroom categories of the inaugural UAAP Ballroom Competition on September 3, 2016 inside the University of Santo Tomas campus in Espana Boulevard, Manila. Ballroom Dancing is a demonstration sport.

Cheerdance
The UAAP Season 79 cheerdance competition was held on November 19, 2016 at the Smart Araneta Coliseum. It was hosted by University of Santo Tomas, the season's host. University of the Philippines Pep Squad skipped the UAAP Season 79 Cheerdance Competition due to an unresolved protest against last year's results. Cheerdance competition is an exhibition event. Points for the overall championship are not awarded to the participating schools.

Team standings
 
Order refers to order of performance.

Special awards from sponsors:
 Yamaha Best Toss: NU Pep Squad
 Jollibee Over-The-Top Pyramid: NU Pep Squad

Group stunts competition

Streetdance
The 4th UAAP Street Dance Competition was held on May 20, 2017 at the UST Plaza Mayor hosted by University of Santo Tomas. Street dance competition is an exhibition event. Points for the general championship are not awarded to the participating schools. NU Underdawgz did not participate for the second straight year.

Host team in boldface

General championship summary 
The general champion is determined by a point system. The system gives 15 points to the champion team of a UAAP event, 12 to the runner-up, and 10 to the third placer. The following points: 8, 6, 4, 2 and 1 are given to the rest of the participating teams according to their order of finish.

Medals table

Seniors' division

Juniors' division

General championship tally

Seniors' division

Juniors' division

Closing ceremony

Broadcast coverage
For its 2nd straight season since its broadcast deal renewal, ABS-CBN Sports will provide television and online coverage for all UAAP events. The games will be aired live on S+A Channel 23, S+A HD Channel 166 and their website, sports.abs-cbn.com.

Presenters:
Boom Gonzalez (Men's Seniors Basketball)
Eric Tipan (Men's Seniors Basketball)
Mico Halili (Men's Seniors Basketball)
Nikko Ramos (Men's Seniors Basketball)

Courtside reporters:
Niña Alvia (UP)
Denice Dinsay (Ateneo)
Bea Escudero (DLSU)
Ganiel Krishnan (FEU)
Angelique Manto (UST)
Stef Monce (Adamson)
Ira Pablo (NU)
Pauline Versoza (UE)

Analysts:
Marco Benitez (Men's Seniors Basketball)
Enzo Flojo (Men's Seniors Basketball)
Kirk Long (Men's Seniors Basketball)
Christian Luanzon (Men's Seniors Basketball)
Ronnie Magsanoc (Men's Seniors Basketball)
 TJ Manotoc (Men's Seniors Basketball)
Xavy Nunag (Men's Seniors Basketball)

Upfront at the UAAP hosts
Janeena Chan
Bea Daez
Laura Lehmann
Tricia Robredo
Jeanine Tsoi
Carmela Tunay

Additional hosts:
UAAP Season 79 Opening Ceremony Hosts:TJ Manotoc and Tina Marasigan
UAAP Season 79 Cheerdance Competition Hosts: Nikko Ramos, Gretchen Fullido and Alyssa Valdez

See also
NCAA Season 92

References

 
UAAP
79
UAAP